Dursley James McLinden (29 May 1965 – 7 August 1995) was a Manx actor whose career was mostly focused on the London stage in musicals such as The Phantom of the Opera, Gigi (Lyric Theatre, 1985) and Follies.

He appeared in the title role in the 1988 film Just Ask for Diamond. His television roles included a 1988 appearance in Doctor Who as Sgt Mike Smith in the story Remembrance of the Daleks.

Early life 

At the age of eight, McLinden made his first stage appearance at Willaston School, playing the dame in Dick Whittington. Aged 16, he left his home in Douglas and trained as an actor at the Mountview Theatre School in Peckham. Aged 16, he left his home in Douglas and trained as an actor at the Mountview Theatre School in Peckham.

Death 

Falling ill in 1988, McLinden was diagnosed with HIV AIDS in 1990. As a result, he raised money for West End Cares, the theatrical arm of Aids charity Crusaid. The actor continued working up until a few weeks before his death at the age of 30. His death was attributed to AIDS.

The 2021 AIDS drama It's a Sin contains a tribute to McLinden, by way of series lead Ritchie Tozer (Olly Alexander) appearing in a fictional Doctor Who story called Regression of the Daleks where he plays the character Trooper Linden. It's A Sin writer Russell T Davies met McLinden through a mutual friend.

Other appearances
Mr. Bean Shoe Salesman in Mr. Bean Goes To Town 1991 
After Henry Edward in "Party Politics" 1990 
Just Ask for Diamond 1988 aka Diamond's Edge Tim Diamond
Diamond Brothers – South By South-East Tim Diamond 
Doctor Who – Remembrance of the Daleks 1988; Sgt Mike Smith

References

External links
 

1965 births
1995 deaths
20th-century LGBT people
20th-century Manx male actors
AIDS-related deaths in England
Manx gay actors
Manx male actors
Alumni of the Mountview Academy of Theatre Arts